Steven I. Milligram (died April 28, 2020) was an American judge.

Biography
Milligram was a justice of the New York Supreme Court from 2019 until his death from COVID-19 in Monroe, New York, on April 28, 2020, at age 66, during the COVID-19 pandemic in New York (state).

References

1950s births
2020 deaths
New York Supreme Court Justices
Lawyers from New York City
Deaths from the COVID-19 pandemic in New York (state)